Megachile dubiosa is a species of bee in the family Megachilidae. It was described by Friese in 1909.

References

Dubiosa
Insects described in 1909